The Minister for Local Government in the Government of the Australian state of Victoria is the Minister responsible for supervising the activities of local government councils in the state, recommending allocation of grants to local governments for projects, assessing processes for redistributing municipal boundaries according to population, overseeing tendering processes for council services, airing any concerns of local governments at Cabinet meetings and co-ordinating council community and infrastructure work at a state level. The Minister achieves the Government's objectives through oversight of Local Government Victoria of the Department of Government Services.

All ministers responsible for local government since 1964 have been known as the Minister for Local Government, apart from Caroline Hogg (1991-1992), whose title was Minister for Ethnic, Municipal and Community Affairs.

Since June 2022, the Minister for Local Government has been Melissa Horne in the Labor Andrews Ministry.

List of Ministers for Local Government (since 1964)

References

External links
Local Government Victoria
List of Ministers of the Government of Victoria

Local Government